Dixon is an unincorporated community in Gregory County, in the U.S. state of South Dakota.

History
Dixon was laid out in 1905, and named after Dixon, Illinois, the native home of a first settler. A post office was established at Dixon in 1905, and remained in operation until 1973.

References

Unincorporated communities in Gregory County, South Dakota
Unincorporated communities in South Dakota